Bent Jørgensen (born 8 January 1945) is a former Danish handball player who competed in the 1972 Summer Olympics.

He played his club handball with Stadion IF. In 1972 he was part of the Denmark men's national handball team which finished thirteenth in the Olympic tournament. He played four matches and scored three goals.

External links
Sport-Reference profile

1945 births
Living people
Danish male handball players
Olympic handball players of Denmark
Handball players at the 1972 Summer Olympics